National Meteorological Center of CMA is a subordinate body of the China Meteorological Administration in the People's Republic of China. It is a center for national weather forecasting, climate prediction, climate change study, meteorological information collection and dissemination. It is also designated by the World Meteorological Organization (WMO) as the Regional Specialized Meteorological Center (RSMC) for Asia in case of accidental release and dispersion of radioactive substances. The NMC is finally also the regional meteorological data telecommunication hub for Asia.

The NMC does not only issue full bulletins for tropical cyclones over the northwest Pacific Ocean and the South China Sea. For the Belt and Road as well as the remnants which could impact Tibet and Yunnan occasionally, the NMC started to issue full bulletins for cyclonic storms over the north Indian Ocean (except the Gulf of Aden) on an exclusive page since late 2017.

Organization 

The Center has different sections:
 Weather forecasting office for public and marine interests.
 Numerical prediction models department.
 Specialized meteorological forecast desks for agrometeorology, remote sensing, severe weather monitoring and warnings, forecasting systems laboratory.

References

External links

NMC's North Indian Ocean Tropical Cyclone Bulletin 

China Meteorological Administration
Regional Specialized Meteorological Centres